Nuno Alberto Macedo Pereira (born 29 May 1999) is a Portuguese professional footballer who plays for Penafiel as a goalkeeper.

Club career
He made his Primeira Liga debut for Moreirense on 13 April 2019 in a game against Santa Clara.

On 11 June 2021, he moved to Penafiel.

References

External links

1999 births
Sportspeople from Guimarães
Living people
Portuguese footballers
Association football goalkeepers
Moreirense F.C. players
G.D. Estoril Praia players
F.C. Penafiel players
Primeira Liga players
Liga Portugal 2 players